Karnaphuli Export Processing Zone is an export processing zone in Bangladesh located at the city of Chittagong. It was established in September 2006 on about 222.42 acres of lands in North Patenga and Halishahar area in the city.

See also
 Bangladesh Export Processing Zone Authority
 Uttara Export Processing Zone

References 

Economy of Chittagong
Foreign trade of Bangladesh
Karnaphuli
Buildings and structures in Chittagong
Industrial parks